Skippers is a reality television programme by Raidió Teilifís Éireann (RTÉ). It follows four Irish fishing trawlers.

Boats and skippers
 Buddy M - C333. Seiner/Pelagic Trawler Skipper:Micheal Meade. Home Port - Crosshaven, Co. Cork
 Tea Rose - S73. Seiner Skipper:Cathal O'Sullivan. Home Port - Castletownbere, Co. Cork
 Ainmire - D536. Vivier Crabber Skipper:Ross Classon. Home Port - Portnoo, Co. Donegal / Ullapool, Scotland
 John B - DA39. Twin-Rig Prawn Trawler Skipper David Price. Home Port - Howth, Co. Dublin

The skippers
Michael Meade: 60 miles off the south coast of Cork is skipper Michael Meade. He's been fishing for the past 25 years and has owned his trawler the Buddy M for the past 10 years. Alongside Michael are four regular crew members including Brendan from Cork and Sergey from Warsaw. Michael has seen the fishing industry slowly being eroded and is not too hopeful for the future. He fishes out from the small port of Crosshaven in Cork.

Cathal O'Sullivan: The old fishing village of Castletownbere in Co. Cork is where the ambitious and determined Cathal O'Sullivan is based. Cathal has no background in fishing and originally comes from Kenmare in Kerry. He started fishing at 16 and now at 24 is one of Ireland's youngest skippers in charge of the 80foot trawler the Tea Rose. This €1 million boat is owned by Paddy O'Sullivan who has recently put his faith in Cathal to go it alone.

Cathal leaves behind a young family, his son gets upset each time Cathal leaves, but Cathal's duration at sea is getting longer due to the rising price of fuel and the decrease in the value of his catch. He often will do three fishing trips in a row leaving his family for up to 20 days at a time. With every trip comes the pressure of finding a good catch for the crew in order for himself and his men to earn a decent wage.

Ross Classon: Portnoo in Donegal is home to 42-year-old skipper Ross Classon. He's been fishing since he was 15. But Ross has no family background in the industry and is the son of a school principal. He went to sea purely because he loved it. This comes with a price to pay as he has less time to spend on shore with his family, when he does come home it is not long before Ross has to leave again.

His wife of 25 years, Anna, remembers the strain of bringing up their sons while Ross was out at sea. Anna has learned to deal with not seeing Ross for weeks at a time, she's learned to cope but she knows other families who haven't found things so easy. Ross's boat is based in Ullapool, Northern Scotland. He has to make the 430 mile journey by road and sea.

David Price: Howth in North County Dublin is home to the Price fishing family and youngest son David is carrying on the tradition as an energetic skipper on his fathers 60 foot, €2 million trawler "The John B". David is fishing 80 miles off the east coast of Ireland in search of prawns. Times have changed for David as he has to work twice as hard as he did five years ago when he used to sell his prawns for double what he's getting for them today.

David is frustrated with regulations that make little sense. He has to throw away perfectly good fish due to quotas. The pressure of costs versus the price he is receiving for his catch is not adding up and this frustration is sometimes taken out on his crew.

The collapse of the building industry has meant that some Irish are looking at fishing again for work. This trip has brought on board two former construction workers John and Emmet who both want to make a go of it in the fishing business. For John it's a big change from his previous job as a plumber but he's hoping he won't have to be fishing for too long.

This trip will be make or break for the two Irish lads as David has to decide if they are cut out for the hard life at sea.

His training is tough and they won't be getting any special treatment.

Irish documentary television series
RTÉ original programming